Robert Russell (24 May 1936 – 12 May 2008) was an English actor known for a memorable supporting role as John Stearne alongside Vincent Price in the classic British horror film Witchfinder General (1968).
 
He was born in Kent, England. His family emigrated to South Africa for 9 years when he was aged 11. He worked in a gold mine after leaving school. He returned to England and trained as an actor at the Webber Douglas Academy of Dramatic Art. He then appeared onstage with the Lord Olivier and actors such as Sir Michael Gambon, as a member of the National Theatre touring company.

He made numerous appearances on UK television, often playing tough characters and villains due to his imposing stature, including The Avengers, The Sweeney, Space: 1999, Blake's 7 and Doctor Who, playing a guard in the serial entitled The Power of the Daleks and a Highland Games Champion, The Caber, in Terror of the Zygons. Some of his other film appearances included Othello (1965), The Whisperers (1967), Bedazzled (1967) with Peter Cook and Dudley Moore, Inspector Clouseau (1968), The Breaking of Bumbo (1970), Man in the Wilderness (1971) with Richard Harris, Sitting Target (1972), Double Exposure (1977), Queen of the Blues (1979) starring Mary Millington, Ivanhoe (1982), Oliver Twist (1982), and the TV film of The Sign of Four (1983).

He lived for the last 14 years of his life in Maidenhead, Berkshire and died there of a heart attack at his home aged 71.

Partial filmography
 1961 The Sinister Man as Uniformed Sergeant 
 1963 Shadow of Fear as Ransome
 1965 Othello as Senators-Soldiers-Cypriots
 1967 The Whisperers as Andy
 1967 Robbery as Detective
 1967 Bedazzled as Anger
 1968 Inspector Clouseau as Stockton
 1968 Witchfinder General as John Stearne
 1969 The Spy Killer as Police Sergeant
 1970 Eyewitness as Headquarters Policeman
 1970 The Breaking of Bumbo as Sergeant Clegg
 1970 Carry on Loving as Policeman (uncredited)
 1971 Man in the Wilderness as Smith
 1972 Sitting Target as Prison Warder One
 1977 Double Exposure as Russell, The Kidnapper
 1978 A Hitch in Time as King's Aide (uncredited)
 1979 Queen of the Blues as Roscoe
 1980 Silver Dream Racer as Garage Mechanic
 1982 Ivanhoe as Leader
 1982 Oliver Twist as 2nd Constable
 1983 The Sign of Four as Williams
 1992 Strange Horizons as "Shorty"

References

External links
 
 

1936 births
2008 deaths
English male film actors
English male television actors